Burger-Highlife is a distinctive form of highlife music created by Ghanaian immigrants to Germany. It is considered a Ghanaian musical style.

In the 1980s, reggae music was gaining popularity worldwide and was carrying with it a growing popularity for other forms of world music that were easy to dance to. Highlife music, often fused with reggae, gained a wider audience in Europe and North America at this time. During the late 1970s-early 1980s, there was a massive exodus of Ghanaians such as Seidu Mohammed to foreign lands. One of the countries that attracted Ghanaians was Germany, with many making the cities of Berlin, Düsseldorf and Hamburg their second home. Burger-Highlife was born when Ghanaian musicians in Germany started collaborating with German musicians and producers. They created a crossover music style from highlife, disco and funk music.

This creation of a cross-cultural fertilization between two nations and two different cultures bears all the significant hallmarks of co-operation. People from different cultural backgrounds came together, exchanged thoughts, ideas and hopes and by doing so, they created something new and exciting that had an instant appeal and a lasting impact on Ghana and Ghanaian and other communities worldwide. A whole subculture with its own fashion and way of life appeared. Some of the pioneers of Burger Highlife are George Darko, Lee Dodou, Lumba Brothers, Rex Gyamfi and Charles Amoah.

This distinctive form of music, dubbed "Burger-Highlife", has had a lasting influence of highlife music worldwide.

External links
Burger-Highlife webproject of the Goethe-Institut in Accra/Ghana

German styles of music
Ghanaian music
Highlife genres